Carnotaurinae is a subfamily of the theropod dinosaur family Abelisauridae.  It includes the dinosaurs Aucasaurus (from Argentina), Carnotaurus (from Argentina). The group was first proposed by American paleontologist Paul Sereno in 1998, defined as a clade containing all abelisaurids more closely related to Carnotaurus than to Majungasaurus.

Classification

Subfamily Carnotaurinae
Brachyrostra
Ekrixinatosaurus (Argentina)
Elemgasem (Argentina)
Guemesia (Argentina)
Ilokelesia (Argentina)
Niebla (Argentina)
Skorpiovenator (Argentina)
Thanos (Brazil)
Furileusauria
Llukalkan (Argentina)
Viavenator (Argentina)
Pycnonemosaurus (Brazil)
Quilmesaurus (Argentina)
Carnotaurini
Carnotaurus (Argentina)
Abelisaurinae
Aucasaurus (Argentina)
Abelisaurus (Argentina)

Phylogeny
In 2008, Canale et al. published a phylogenetic analysis focusing on the South American carnotaurines. In their results, they found that all South American forms (including Ilokelesia) grouped together as a sub-clade of Carnotaurinae, which they named Brachyrostra, meaning "short snouts." They defined the clade Brachyrostra as "all the abelisaurids more closely related to Carnotaurus sastrei than to Majungasaurus crenatissimus."

An analysis conducted by Tortosa et al. in 2013 moved several carnotaurine taxa into the newly named Majungasaurinae, and moved many abelisaurids into Carnotaurini.

Carnotaurinae in clagodram according to Rafael Delcourt, 2018.

See also

 Timeline of ceratosaur research

References

Further reading

Brachyrostrans